Merritt Hotchkiss (before 1814 – 1865 or later) was a merchant and political figure in Lower Canada. He represented L'Acadie in the Legislative Assembly of Lower Canada from 1834 until the suspension of the constitution in 1838.

He was the adopted son of Henry Hoyle. Hotchkiss established himself in business at Lacolle, where he also operated a flour mill. He served as a commissioner for the Tribunal of Minor Pleas. In 1838, he married Sarah Anne Schuyler.

References 
 

Year of death unknown
Members of the Legislative Assembly of Lower Canada
Year of birth uncertain